In arithmetic and computer programming, the extended Euclidean algorithm is an extension to the Euclidean algorithm, and computes, in addition to the greatest common divisor (gcd) of integers a and b, also  the coefficients of Bézout's identity, which are integers x and y such that
 
This is a certifying algorithm, because the gcd is the only number that can simultaneously satisfy this equation and divide the inputs.
It allows one to compute also, with almost no extra cost, the quotients of a and b by their greatest common divisor.

 also refers to a very similar algorithm for computing the polynomial greatest common divisor and the coefficients of Bézout's identity of two univariate polynomials.

The extended Euclidean algorithm is particularly useful when a and b are coprime. With that provision, x is the modular multiplicative inverse of a modulo b, and y is the modular multiplicative inverse of b modulo a. Similarly, the polynomial extended Euclidean algorithm allows one to compute the multiplicative inverse in algebraic field extensions and, in particular in finite fields of non prime order. It follows that both extended Euclidean algorithms are widely used in cryptography. In particular, the computation of the modular multiplicative inverse is an essential step in the derivation of key-pairs in the RSA public-key encryption method.

Description
The standard Euclidean algorithm proceeds by a succession of Euclidean divisions whose quotients are not used. Only the remainders are kept. For the extended algorithm, the successive quotients are used. More precisely, the standard Euclidean algorithm with a and b as input, consists of computing a sequence  of quotients and a sequence  of remainders such that 

The computation stops when one reaches a remainder  which is zero; the greatest common divisor is then the last non zero remainder 

The extended Euclidean algorithm proceeds similarly, but adds two other sequences, as follows

The computation also stops when  and gives 
 is the greatest common divisor of the input  and 

This implies that the pair of Bézout's coefficients provided by the extended Euclidean algorithm is the minimal pair of Bézout coefficients, as being the unique pair satisfying both above inequalities .

Also it means that the algorithm can be done without integer overflow by a computer program using integers of a fixed size that is larger than that of a and b.

Example 

The greatest common divisor is the last non zero entry,  in the column "remainder". Bézout coefficients appear in the last two entries of the second-to-last row. In fact, it is easy to verify that .

Proof 
Thus it must stop with some  This proves that the algorithm stops eventually.

(Until this point, the proof is the same as that of the classical Euclidean algorithm.)

As  and  we have  for i = 0 and 1. The relation follows by induction for all :

Consider the matrix

The recurrence relation may be rewritten in matrix form

The matrix  is the identity matrix and its determinant is one. The determinant of the rightmost matrix in the preceding formula is −1. The relation  that has been proved above and Euclid's lemma show that  divides , that is that  for some integer .

Then, and  if , it can be seen that the s and t sequences for (a,b) under the EEA are, up to initial 0s and 1s, the t and s sequences for (b,a). The definitions then show that the (a,b) case reduces to the (b,a) case. So assume that  without loss of generality.

The same is true for the  after the first few terms, for the same reason. Furthermore, it is easy to see that  (when a and b are both positive and ). Thus,

This, accompanied by the fact that  are larger than or equal to in absolute value than any previous  or  respectively completed the proof.

Polynomial extended Euclidean algorithm 

For univariate polynomials with coefficients in a field, everything works similarly, Euclidean division, Bézout's identity and extended Euclidean algorithm. The first difference is that, in the Euclidean division and the algorithm, the inequality  has to be replaced by an inequality on the degrees  Otherwise, everything which precedes in this article remains the same, simply by replacing integers by polynomials.

A second difference lies in the bound on the size of the Bézout coefficients provided by the extended Euclidean algorithm, which is more accurate in the polynomial case, leading to the following theorem.

If a and b are two nonzero polynomials, then the extended Euclidean algorithm produces the unique pair of polynomials (s, t) such that

and

A third difference is that, in the polynomial case, the greatest common divisor is defined only up to the multiplication by a non zero constant. There are several ways to define unambiguously a greatest common divisor.

In mathematics, it is common to require that the greatest common divisor be a monic polynomial. To get this, it suffices to divide every element of the output by the leading coefficient of  This allows that, if a and b are coprime, one gets 1 in the right-hand side of Bézout's inequality. Otherwise, one may get any non-zero constant. In computer algebra, the polynomials commonly have integer coefficients, and this way of normalizing the greatest common divisor introduces too many fractions to be convenient.

If the input polynomials are coprime, this normalisation also provides a greatest common divisor equal to 1. The drawback of this approach is that a lot of fractions should be computed and simplified during the computation.

A third approach consists in extending the algorithm of subresultant pseudo-remainder sequences in a way that is similar to the extension of the Euclidean algorithm to the extended Euclidean algorithm. This allows that, when starting with polynomials with integer coefficients, all polynomials that are computed have integer coefficients. Moreover, every computed remainder  is a subresultant polynomial. In particular, if the input polynomials are coprime, then the Bézout's identity becomes 

where  denotes the resultant of a and b. In this form of Bézout's identity, there is no denominator in the formula. If one divides everything by the resultant one gets the classical Bézout's identity, with an explicit common denominator for the rational numbers that appear in it.

Pseudocode
 
To implement the algorithm that is described above, one should first remark that only the two last values of the indexed variables are needed at each step. Thus, for saving memory, each indexed variable must be replaced by just two variables.

For simplicity, the following algorithm (and the other algorithms in this article) uses parallel assignments. In a programming language which does not have this feature, the parallel assignments need to be simulated with an auxiliary variable. For example, the first one,
 (old_r, r) := (r, old_r - quotient * r)
is equivalent to
 prov := r;
 r := old_r - quotient × prov;
 old_r := prov;
and similarly for the other parallel assignments.
This leads to the following code:

 function extended_gcd(a, b)
     (old_r, r) := (a, b)
     (old_s, s) := (1, 0)
     (old_t, t) := (0, 1)
     
     while r ≠ 0 do
         quotient := old_r div r
         (old_r, r) := (r, old_r − quotient × r)
         (old_s, s) := (s, old_s − quotient × s)
         (old_t, t) := (t, old_t − quotient × t)
     
     output "Bézout coefficients:", (old_s, old_t)
     output "greatest common divisor:", old_r
     output "quotients by the gcd:", (t, s)

The quotients of a and b by their greatest common divisor, which is output, may have an incorrect sign. This is easy to correct at the end of the computation but has not been done here for simplifying the code. Similarly, if either a or b is zero and the other is negative, the greatest common divisor that is output is negative, and all the signs of the output must be changed.

Finally, notice that in Bézout's identity, one can solve for  given . Thus, an optimization to the above algorithm is to compute only the  sequence (which yields the Bézout coefficient ), and then compute  at the end:

 function extended_gcd(a, b)
     s := 0;    old_s := 1
     r := b;    old_r := a
          
     while r ≠ 0 do
         quotient := old_r div r
         (old_r, r) := (r, old_r − quotient × r)
         (old_s, s) := (s, old_s − quotient × s)
     
     if b ≠ 0 then
         bezout_t := (old_r − old_s × a) div b
     else
         bezout_t := 0
     
     output "Bézout coefficients:", (old_s, bezout_t)
     output "greatest common divisor:", old_r

However, in many cases this is not really an optimization: whereas the former algorithm is not susceptible to overflow when used with machine integers (that is, integers with a fixed upper bound of digits), the multiplication of old_s * a in computation of bezout_t can overflow, limiting this optimization to inputs which can be represented in less than half the maximal size. When using integers of unbounded size, the time needed for multiplication and division grows quadratically with the size of the integers. This implies that the "optimisation" replaces a sequence of multiplications/divisions of small integers by a single multiplication/division, which requires more computing time than the operations that it replaces, taken together.

Simplification of fractions
This canonical simplified form can be obtained by replacing the three output lines of the preceding pseudo code by 
 if  then output "Division by zero"
 if  then ;     (for avoiding negative denominators)
 if  then output         (for avoiding denominators equal to 1)
 output 

To get the canonical simplified form, it suffices to move the minus sign for having a positive denominator.

If  divides  evenly, the algorithm executes only one iteration, and we have  at the end of the algorithm. It is the only case where the output is an integer.

Computing multiplicative inverses in modular structures

The extended Euclidean algorithm is the essential tool for computing multiplicative inverses in modular structures, typically the modular integers and the algebraic field extensions. A notable instance of the latter case are the finite fields of non-prime order.

Modular integers

In particular, if  is prime,  has a multiplicative inverse if it is not zero (modulo ). Thus  is a field if and only if  is prime.

Reducing this identity modulo  gives 

Also, for getting a result which is positive and lower than n, one may use the fact that the integer  provided by the algorithm satisfies . That is, if , one must add  to it at the end. This results in the pseudocode, in which the input n is an integer larger than 1.
 function inverse(a, n)
     t := 0;     newt := 1
     r := n;     newr := a
 
     while newr ≠ 0 do
         quotient := r div newr
         (t, newt) := (newt, t − quotient × newt) 
         (r, newr) := (newr, r − quotient × newr)
 
     if r > 1 then
         return "a is not invertible"
     if t < 0 then
         t := t + n
 
     return t

Simple algebraic field extensions 

The extended Euclidean algorithm is also the main tool for computing multiplicative inverses in simple algebraic field extensions. An important case, widely used in cryptography and coding theory, is that of finite fields of non-prime order.

This is done by the extended Euclidean algorithm.

The algorithm is very similar to that provided above for computing the modular multiplicative inverse.

 function inverse(a, p)
     t := 0;     newt := 1
     r := p;     newr := a
 
     while newr ≠ 0 do
         quotient := r div newr
         (r, newr) := (newr, r − quotient × newr)
         (t, newt) := (newt, t − quotient × newt)
 
     if degree(r) > 0 then 
         return "Either p is not irreducible or a is a multiple of p"
 
     return (1/r) × t

Example

For example, if the polynomial used to define the finite field GF(28) is p = x8 + x4 + x3 + x + 1, and a = x6 + x4 + x + 1 is the element whose inverse is desired, then performing the algorithm results in the computation described in the following table. Let us recall that in fields of order 2n, one has -z = z and z + z = 0 for every element z in the field). Since 1 is the only nonzero element of GF(2), the adjustment in the last line of the pseudocode is not needed.

The case of more than two numbers 
One can handle the case of more than two numbers iteratively. First we show that . To prove this let . Let . And since  the result is proven.

 

So then to apply to n numbers we use induction

with the equations following directly.

See also
 Euclidean domain
 Linear congruence theorem
 Kuṭṭaka

References 
  Volume 2, Chapter 4.
 Thomas H. Cormen, Charles E. Leiserson, Ronald L. Rivest, and Clifford Stein. Introduction to Algorithms, Second Edition. MIT Press and McGraw-Hill, 2001. . Pages 859–861 of section 31.2: Greatest common divisor.

External links

 Source for the form of the algorithm used to determine the multiplicative inverse in GF(2^8)

Number theoretic algorithms
Articles with example pseudocode
Euclid